Daniel Buchanan may refer to:

 Daniel Buchanan (Shortland Street), a character from the soap opera Shortland Street
 Daniel Buchanan (mathematician) (1880–1950), Canadian mathematics and astronomy professor